Brojen Das (Bengali: ব্রজেন দাস; 9 December 1927 – 1 June 1998) was a Bangladeshi swimmer, who was the first Asian to swim across the English Channel, and the first person to cross it six times.

Early life and education 

Brojen was born in the Kuchiamora village of Bikrampur, Bengal Presidency, British India (now Munshiganj, Bangladesh). His father was Harendra Kumar Das. He completed the matriculation exam in 1946 from KL Jubilee High School. He earned his Bachelor of Arts degree from Vidyasagar College in Calcutta.

Swimming 

Since boyhood Brojen practised swimming in Buriganga River. After his own initiative, the East Pakistan Sports Federation introduced an annual swimming competition in Dhaka in 1953. He was invited to take part in the English Channel Swimming Competition in 1958. As a part of his training he swam in Shitalakshya River, in lower Meghna River and a distance of 46 miles starting from Narayanganj to Chandpur. Prior to the competition, he also swam in the Mediterranean Sea from Capri to Naples.

At midnight on 18 August 1958, Brojen began swimming to cross the English Channel along with other competitors from 23 countries. He completed the course on the next day after noon.

Brojen crossed the English Channel a total of 6 times from 1958 to 1961.

Achievements

Local 
 Champion in 100-meter freestyle swimming competition in West Bengal in 1952.
 Champion in East Pakistan in 100, 200, 400 & 1500 meter freestyle swimming in 1953–1956.
 Champion in Pakistan in 100 & 400-meter freestyle swimming in 1955.

International 
 Italy, July 1958, winner (placed 3rd) in the Capri Island to Naples 33-kilometer-long-distance swimming competition.
 England, August 1958, secured first position among the male competitors in the Billy Butlin's Channel Crossing Swimming Competition; 39 competitors from 23 nations participated in the competition.
 England, August 1959, successfully completed the Channel Crossing Swimming Competition from France to England.
 England, September 1959, successfully completed the Channel Swim from England to France.
 England, August 1960, successfully completed the Channel Swim from France to England.
 England, September 1961, crossed the Channel once again from France to England.
 England, September 1961, obtained the world record for the fastest swim across the English Channel from France to England.

Awards 

 1956: Awarded by Dhaka University
 1960: Pride of Performance award by the Pakistan government.
 1965: Induction into the International Marathon Swimming Hall of Fame
 1986: Letona Trophy, i.e. King of the Channel from the Channel Swimming Association of the United Kingdom
 1976: National Sports Award, Bangladesh
 Atish Dipankar Medal
 Gold Medal by Kazi Mahabubullah Trust and Jahanara Jana Kalyan Trust
 1999: Independence Day Award, Bangladesh (posthumous)

Death 
Brojen was detected to have cancer in June 1997. He went to Calcutta, India, for treatment, and died there on 1 June 1998. His funeral was held at Postagola cremation site in Dhaka on 3 June 1998.

References

Further reading

External links 
 Website on Brojen Das, maintained by his family
 

1927 births
1998 deaths
Bangladeshi male swimmers
Bangladeshi Hindus
Pakistani male swimmers
Recipients of the Pride of Performance
Recipients of the Independence Day Award
People from Munshiganj District
Vidyasagar College alumni
University of Calcutta alumni
English Channel swimmers
People from Bikrampur
Deaths from cancer in India